The Odense Bulldogs are a professional ice hockey team based in Odense, Denmark. They currently play in Ret&Råd Fyn Arena in the Bolbro area, as a part of the best Danish league Metal Ligaen, and they are furthermore the only hockey team from Funen. The team was founded in 1978 and was promoted to the top league in 1991. Odense Bulldogs has never won Metal Ligaen, but achieved three silver medals. Their latest trip to the finals was in the 2011–12 season, where they faced Herning Blue Fox. In that final series, they got the leads 2–0 and 3–1, but ended up losing the last three and lost it 3–4 on aggregate. They have also won the annual tournament cup four times, last time in the 2015–16 season.

Club history

1999–2004: Simioni era
After having been in the league for eight years Odense Bulldogs acquired Mario Simioni and named him player-coach for the 1999–2000 season. for the 2000–01 season Simioni retired as hockey player and was named head coach of the team. Under Simioni, Odense Bulldogs went to the finals for the first time in club history in 2001–02, but ended up losing to Rungsted IK. In the 2002–03 season, Simioni took the bulldogs to their second playoff final in two years, but again ended up losing this time to Herning Blue Fox.  Mario Simioni coached Bulldogs for one more year, before traveling to Germany and then SønderjyskE, resulting in the end of an era. It would take Odense Bulldogs 9 years before returning to the playoff finals.

2008–2014: Pär Johansson, return to finals
Though leaving Odense Bulldogs for the 07–08 season, Pär Johansson returned to Odense Bulldogs and was named Assistant Coach under Head Coach Dean Fedorchuk for the 08–09 and 09–10 seasons. After losing the Bronze medal game and missing the playoffs for the 08–09 and 09–10 seasons, it was the newly named Head Coach Pär Johanssons job to get Odense Bulldogs back on track. In his first year as Head Coach for the 10–11 season Johansson did not get Bulldogs to the playoffs and had to settle for 8th place.

After missing the playoffs two years in a row, something that had not happened since their two first seasons (91–92, 92–93), Odense Bulldogs suddenly found themselves returning to the Playoff finals, in a glorious playoff run. Winning the first two round by a score of 8–0, Odense Bulldogs headed to the finals against Herning Bluefox undefeated. After getting the lead 2–0 and 3–1 in games, Odense Bulldogs had a chance to win their first championship ever at home. Not only did Odense bulldogs lose the first elimination game, but the follow two games, resulting in a game seven final loss at home.

Following a game seven loss in the 2011–12 season and another bronze game loss in 2012–13, Pär Johansson left the club mid January 2014. Henrik Benjaminsen and Odense Bulldogs alumni Mads True coached Odense Bulldogs for the remainder for the season and an early Playoff exit.

2014–2016: Gratton and Cup champions
Season: 2014–2015

After firing their old coach, Bulldogs acquired head coach Brad Gratton from Rødovre Mighty Bulls. Among their eight foreigners was 1st round pick by the Nashville Predators, Chet Pickard. Keyplayers such as Canadian winger Dale Mitchell and Center Ryan McDonough was also acquired. Odense dominated a huge part of the regular season with a 12-game winning streak, making them league leaders. They lost many of their last games of the season and had to settle for 4th place
After winning the first Quarterfinal game 8–2 in the Metal Cup tournament against Herning Blue Fox, Odense lost the second game 8–1, resulting in an early exit in the 2014–15 Metal Cup tournament

After ending on 4th place, Bulldogs picked 5th Esbjerg Energy. After losing the first four games, Bulldogs playoff run ended in the quarterfinals

Season: 2015–2016

After losing all four games out of seven to Esbjerg Energy in the quarter finals in the 2014–15 season, the Bulldogs extended contract with keyplayers such as Dale Mitchell,  Ryan McDonough and Joakim Nettelbladt. After sending last years netminder Chet Pickard to Iserlohn Roosters, the Bulldogs  signed Czech goaltender Tadeas Galansky and two big forwards, American winger Sean Wiles and Canadien center John Armstrong. After issues with former captain Morten Andreassen resulting in him being sent down to the minors, Joakim Nettelbladt became the 7th Bulldogs captain in 9 years, with Ryan McDonough, Dale Mitchell, Mike Daugulis and Søren B. Pedersen Serving as alternates. Odense Bulldogs was the most scoring team, with 191 goals for in 45 games. Odense was the 4th worst defensive team, letting up 154 Goals against. The Bulldogs ended on 5th place and no home advantage.

In the annual cup tournament, Odense Bulldogs won their first game of the tournament against Gentofte Stars 4–2. In the quarterfinals they won both games against Herlev Eagles 6–3 and 5–3.  Odense won both games in the Semifinals against Aalborg Pirates, advancing to the 2015-16 Cup finals. The bulldogs won against league leading Frederikshavn White Hawks 4–0, taking home 4th Cup. Goaltender Tadeas Galansky was named Cup Final MVP.

Bulldogs were picked by 4th place Herning Blue Fox for the 2015-16 Metal Ligaen playoff quarterfinals. Game one resulted in a 2–1 home win to Herning. Game two was a Shootout victory by Odense, evening out the score 1–1 after two games. in Game three Bulldogs lost 6–1. Game four was a 2–1 victory to the bulldogs, again making the overall score 2–2. Game five was won in  overtime on a goal by Dale Mitchell, giving Odense a 3–2 lead. Odense loss 2–1 at home making the series 3–3 resulting in a game 7. In game 7 Odense Bulldogs lost in overtime, after tying the game with less than 2 minutes left. The game 7 quarterfinal loss, ended the 2015–16 season for the bulldogs, resulting in the 3rd quarterfinal exit in three years.

For the 2015–16 season Odense Bulldogs were part of a 10 episode TV documentary, Men of steel: Odense Bulldogs (Mænd af stål). This behind the scenes documentary took Danish hockey fans and sport fans to uncharted territory. It was the first time in Danish sport history, that a TV crew was allowed to follow a team for an entire season. The series was broadcast on TV 2 Sport.

2016–2017: Peter Johansson
Season: 2016–2017

Odense Bulldogs decided not to resign coach Brad Gratton, instead they signed former Frederikshavn Whitehawks coach Peter Johansson. After locking up last years Metal Cup MVP, Goaltender Tadeas Galansky to a two-year contract extension, they also signed former captain and Odense native, Michael Eskesen. They also resigned last year Metal ligaen topscorer and Bulldogs star Dale Mitchell  to a one-year contract, making it his third season with the Bulldogs. From Lørenskog Odense Bulldogs acquired forward Tony Romano and Robin Sterner. On September 7 it was announced that Michael Eskesen, for the second in his career and as a Bulldog, would serve as captain of the team, with Dale Mitchell and Simon Grønvaldt as alternates. To start of the season, the Odense Bulldogs were eliminated from the annual Metal Cup tournament, losing 3–2 to Aalborg Pirates, with Pirates scoring the game winner with only 14 seconds left.

After clinching the IIHF Continental Cup final at home, Odense Bulldogs won 10 in a row, making them undefeated in December and 15 straight games with at least one point. Odense Bulldogs played the Continental Cup finals in Ritten against Nottingham Panthers, Ritten Rittner Baum and Beibarys Atyrau. First game of the tournament was a 2–0 loss to the Panthers. Second day of play resulted in a 4–1 win to the Bulldogs. On the third and final day and still being able to win it all, the Odense Bulldogs lost in OT to the Beibarys Atyrau, with the Kazakhs tying the game with only 14 seconds left. The Odense bulldogs would go home to Denmark with an overall good performance and a bronze medal.

The Odense Bulldogs finished 2nd place in the 2016/17 regular season, for the first time in 5 years. the 2016/17 season was also their most winning season, with 31 wins in 45 games. Making it the season with the best win/game ratio. The Odense Bulldogs choose Rungsted Seier Capital, who finished 8th, to meet them in the quarterfinales. Odense advanced to the Semifinals for the first time in 4 years  by winning the first 4 games in the 7 game series. In the semifinals Odense Bulldogs lost to Gentofte Stars 4–1 in the best of 7 series.

2017–present 
Season: 2017–2018

Following a semifinal exit the year before, head coach Peter Johansson left the club along with other star players, such as 16/17 league leading goalie Tadeas Galansky. Two time topscorer Dale Mitchell, was the only foreign player to extend his contract, making it his fourth year in a row as a Bulldog.
Bulldogs signed 55-year old Finnish Kari Rauhanen as head coach. But after only ten regular season games, he decided to stop due to "personal matters". The board immediately hired Mikael Gath as new head coach.

European appearances 
In June 2016, it was decided that Odense Bulldogs were to host the 2016–17 IIHF Continental Cup semifinals in November 2016. This was going to be the club's second European appearance and first time hosting one. Odense Bulldogs clinched the Continental cup finals with a second place in the semifinals after wins over Rouen and Donbass. In the finals they lost to Nottingham Panthers, won against Ritten, but lost in overtime to the Kazakhian team Atyrau, making them third overall and had to settle for a bronze medal.

Season by season record

Players

Current roster

Honored members
7 Lars Oxholm, D, 1994–2006
12 Mads True, C, 1990–95, 2002–12

Captains

 Scott Matzka, 2006–08
 Mads True, 2008–11
 Michael Eskesen, 2011–12
 Zach Tarkir, 2012–13
 Søren Pedersen, 2013–14
 Morten Andreasen, 2014–15
 Joakim Nettelbladt, 2015–16
 Michael Eskesen, 2016–17
 Jacob Johnston, 2017–18
 Martin Larsen, 2018–present

Club officials
 Owner: Bulldogs Odense ApS

Board
 Chairman: Henrik Benjaminsen
 Members of the board: Vandy Bæk Thorsen, Michael Hjortholm, Angus King, Irene Blomberg, Anders Blicher Petersen, Thomas Andersen

Administration
 Acting director: Angus King
 Sales manager: Allan Hoffmann
 Seller: Michael Nystrøm Svendsen
 Communication manager: Jonas Kvist Jepsen

Coaching staff
 Head coach: Mikael Gath
 Assistant coach: Mads True
 Interim helping coach: Andreas Lilja
 Physical coach: Søren Jakobsen

Material staff
 Material: Christian Ebersbach, Jørgen Grønbæk, Henrik 'Kondi' Nielsen, Steen Ravnborg, Torben Clausen

Medical & sports science staff
 Club doctor: Henrik Ømark, Jens Faaborg-Andersen, Karsten Bülow, Søren Mikkelsen, Kristian Moi Vårdal
 Physioterapist: Rasmus Holst

References

Ice hockey teams in Denmark
Sport in Odense
Ice hockey clubs established in 1978
1978 establishments in Denmark